"You Know My Name" is a 2006 song by Chris Cornell and the theme to the James Bond film Casino Royale.

You Know My Name may also refer to:

 You Know My Name (film), a 1999 television film
 "You Know My Name" (Courtney Love song), 2014
 "You Know My Name (Look Up the Number)", a 1970 song by The Beatles
 "You Know My Name" (Jang Minho song), 2017
 You Know My Name, an album by Frankie Bones